Ohthere of Hålogaland was a Viking Age Norwegian seafarer known only from an account of his travels that he gave to King Alfred (r. 871–99) of the Anglo-Saxon kingdom of Wessex in about 890 AD. His account was incorporated into an Old English adaptation of a Latin historical book written early in the fifth century by Paulus Orosius, called Historiarum Adversum Paganos Libri VII, or Seven Books of History Against the Pagans. The Old English version of this book is believed to have been written in Wessex in King Alfred's lifetime or soon after his death, and the earliest surviving copy is attributed to the same place and time.

In his account, Ohthere said that his home was in "Halgoland", or Hålogaland, where he lived "north-most of all Norwegians … [since] no-one [lived] to the north of him". Ohthere spoke of his travels north to the White Sea, and south to Denmark, describing both journeys in some detail. He also spoke of Sweoland (central Sweden), the Sami people (Finnas), and of two peoples called the Cwenas, living in Cwena land to the north of the Swedes, and the Beormas, whom he found living by the White Sea. Ohthere reported that the Beormas spoke a language related to that of the Sami.

Ohthere's story is the earliest known written source for the term "Denmark" (dena mearc), and perhaps also for "Norway" (norðweg). Ohthere's home may have been in the vicinity of Tromsø, in southern Troms county, northern Norway. Ohthere was involved in the fur trade.

Sources
Orosius' 5th-century Seven Books of History Against the Pagans was a popular work of history in the Middle Ages, with about 250 manuscript copies from that period surviving today. Late in the 9th century King Alfred of Wessex, or members of his court, appear to have seen it as a useful basis for a world-history written in their own language, and an Old English version may have been seen as complementary to Bede's 8th-century Ecclesiastical History of the English People and the Anglo-Saxon Chronicle, which was begun in Alfred's reign. The Old English version of Orosius is an adaptation rather than a direct translation, one of its features being the addition and correction of information concerning European geography. The addition of Ohthere's account of his travels, and that of another traveller named Wulfstan, represents part of that process.

The authorship of the Old English Orosius is unknown. In the 12th century William of Malmesbury believed that it was the work of King Alfred himself, but scholarly scrutiny of the text since the mid-20th century, including by the historians Dorothy Whitelock and Janet Bately, has led to this view being refuted on lexical and syntactic grounds. Janet Bately believes that the Old English version of Orosius was created between 889 and 899, probably in the early 890s, but there is no way of knowing whether Ohthere's account was previously in existence and incorporated from the outset, or if it was written down later and incorporated into a subsequent copy. The events that Ohthere described may have taken place at any time from the 870s to the late 890s, and Ohthere's account is given in the form of a third-person report of what he said to King Alfred, rather than as reported speech, as exemplified by the opening sentence: "Ohthere sæde his hlaforde Ælfrede kynincge þæt he ealra Norðmanna norðmest bude." ("Ohthere told his lord Alfred king that he lived northmost of all Norwegians.") Dorothy Whitelock wrote that "Ohthere's account reads like a set of replies to questions put to him."

The Old English version of Orosius survives almost complete in two Anglo-Saxon manuscripts. The earliest is known variously as the Tollemache, Helmingham or Lauderdale Orosius, and is kept at the British Library under the reference "Additional 47967". This manuscript was written in Wessex between about 892 and 925, possibly at Winchester. The second manuscript dates from early in the 11th century, is of unknown English provenance, and is kept at the British Library under the reference "Cotton Tiberius B. i". Both manuscripts are copies of a "common ancestor".

Biography
Ohthere said that he lived furthest north of all Norwegians, and that his home was in "Halgoland", in the north of Norway, by the sea. Halgoland is identified in modern historiography as Hålogaland, a historical region of northern Norway comparable in area to the modern region of Nord-Norge. While greater precision is impossible, suggested localities for Ohthere's home include Senja, Kvaløya and Malangen, all near Tromsø. He claimed to be a leading man in his homeland, perhaps to be understood as a chieftain, and described himself as wealthy, owning 600 tame reindeer, of which six were "decoys" used for catching wild reindeer. Conversely, according to the report in the Old English Orosius, Ohthere "had not more than twenty horned cattle, and twenty sheep, and twenty swine, and the little that he ploughed he ploughed with horses." But his main wealth was in tax paid by the Finnas, or Sami people, of whom the highest-born paid 15 marten skins, 5 reindeer skins, 1 bear skin, 10 ambers of feathers, 1 coat of bear skin or otter skin and two ship's ropes, each 60 ells long, made of either whale skin or seal skin.

Another source of Ohthere's wealth was the hunting of whales and walrus. He is reported as saying that his own land was best for whale-hunting, with walrus up to 7 ells long and whales mostly 50 ells long, and that with five men he had killed sixty of them in two days. While the killing of this number of whales in two days seems unlikely, historian Kjell-Olav Masdalen suggests that, rather than whales, Ohthere intended the number killed to refer to walrus; Janet Bately suggests that it might best be seen as an indication of how many whales could be caught in good conditions. Ropes of whale skin were of sufficient value to be included in the tax paid to Ohthere by the Sami, and Ohthere said that walrus had "very noble bones in their teeth", some of which he brought to King Alfred.

Anthropologist Ian Whitaker notes that Ohthere has been described as primarily a merchant, and that his visit to King Alfred has been connected with the king's plans for a navy, a desire to escape the Norwegian King Harald Fairhair, or a need to rebuild a lost fortune. Whitaker notes also that there is "no shred of evidence" to support any of these ideas, but for the fact that he had visited the trading centres of "Skiringshal" (sic) and Hedeby. Ohthere said that he had travelled north chiefly to hunt walrus, and his journey south to the Danish trading settlement of Hedeby, via the "port" of Sciringes heal, may have been a trading mission. There is no account of Ohthere's journey to Wessex or explanation for his visit to King Alfred.

Ohthere's Norway
Ohthere's reported use of the term "Norway" (norðweg) in the earliest copy of the Old English Orosius pre-dates the earliest written Scandinavian use of the term, in the runic form "Nuruiak", on the 10th-century Jelling stones by between 40 and 80 years. While Ohthere is here referring broadly to the width of Norwegian territory between the sea and the mountains, the land described as being about 60 miles across "to the east" is probably to be understood as representing the modern Norwegian region of Vestlandet, in the south-west of the country.

The land of the Norwegians is further delineated through reference to their neighbours. Away from the sea, a wilderness of moors, or mountains, lay to the east and was inhabited by Finnas, a reference to the Sami people. Alongside the southern part of the land, on the other side of the mountains and continuing north, was Sweoland, the "land of the Svear", or Swedes. To the north of the Swedes was Cwenaland, the "land of the Cwenas", and to the north of the Norwegians was wasteland.

Ohthere's travels

Ohthere described two journeys that he had made, one northward and around the Kola Peninsula into the White Sea, and one southward to the Danish trading settlement of Hedeby via a Norwegian "port" which, in the Old English Orosius, is called "Sciringes heal". He described his journeys partly through the lands and peoples he encountered, and partly through the number of days it took to sail from one point to the next:

Journey to the north
Ohthere said that the land stretched far to the north of his home, and that it was all wasteland, except for a few places where finnas (Sami) camped to hunt in the winter and fish in the summer. He said that he once wanted to find out how far the land extended to the north, or if anyone lived north of the waste. He sailed north along the coast for three days, as far north as whale-hunters would go, and continued to travel north as far as he could sail in three days. Then the land there turned east (near North Cape), and he had to wait for a west wind and slightly north and then sailed east along the land for four days. Then he had to wait there for a wind from due north, for the land there turned to the south. He then sailed south along the land for another five days. There  a large  river stretched up into the land, and they turned up into that river because they dared not sail on beyond the river because of "unfrið" (usually translated as "hostility"), since the land was all settled on the other side of the river. He had not previously encountered any cultivated land since he travelled from his own home, but there was waste land all the way on his starboard side, except for fishermen and fowlers and hunters, and they were all finnas, and open sea had always been on his port side.

According to Ohthere, the far bank of the river was "well cultivated" and inhabited by Beormas: historian T.N. Jackson suggests a location for this land – "Bjarmaland" – in the vicinity of the present day Russian town of Kandalaksha, on the western side of the White Sea, while noting that others have identified Ohthere's "large river" as the Northern Dvina, on the eastern side of the White Sea, and place Bjarmaland accordingly. Having just explained how Ohthere did not dare enter the land of the Beormas because it was so well cultivated and because of "unfrið", the report of Ohthere's travels then indicates that he had spoken with them. He explained that the Beormas had told him much about their own land and those of their neighbours, but he says nothing further of this: "he knew not what was true, because he did not see it himself". This incongruity may be explained by his learning of these things from Beormas encountered elsewhere, or from Sami, whose language Ohthere reports as being almost the same as that of the Beormas. Historian Christine Fell suggests that the Old English Orosius' use of the word "unfrið" might rather indicate that Ohthere made a diplomatic approach to the Beormas because he had no trading agreement with them.

The Beormas have been linked with the Old Permic culture, for example through late-medieval treaties dealing with, among other things, a territory called Koloperem, a place-name which "must have emerged as a designation of a land of perem [i.e. Beormas] on the Kola Peninsula": the latter forms the north-western coast of the White Sea, and is defined in part by an inlet of the sea leading to the town of Kandalaksha. The ethnicity of the Beormas and the Perm remains uncertain, but the term "perem" may have originated as a word used for nomadic tradesmen, rather than an ethnic group.

Journey south to Hedeby
Ohthere's account of a journey to the Danish trading settlement of Hedeby, Old English æt hæþum "[port] at the heaths" and German Haithabu, begins with a reference to a place in the south of Norway named Sciringes heal, to which he said one could not sail [from his home in Hålogaland] in one month if one camped at night and each day had a fair [or: contrary] wind ("Þyder he cwæð þæt man ne mihte geseglian on anum monðe gyf man on niht wicode and ælce dæge hæfde ambyrne wind"). This sentence has very often been quoted in literature. Old English ambyrne (accusative singular masculine; the nominative would be ambyre) is a hapax legomenon in Old English. Since around 1600 the traditionally accepted rendering of the phrase in English has been, without ultimate proof, "fair/favourable wind" in translations and dictionaries; on the other hand only a handful of scholars have supported the meaning "contrary".  In contrast to the account of his journey to the north ("He sailed north", "the land turned eastwards" etc.) and the voyage from Sciringes heal to Hedeby ("When he sailed", "before he came to Hedeby" etc.), Ohthere does not employ the past tense when he describes sailing south along the Norwegian coast; he does not report a story from his own viewpoint but speaks in general terms for an anonymous mariner: "One cannot sail", "if one camped at night", "he will sail", "to him will be at first", "until he comes". Michael Korhammer, a proponent of "contrary wind", concludes from this change of aspect that the ambyrne-wind-sentence is not about Ohthere's own travelling experience nor does it refer to normal sailing speeds in his period, as was often assumed by critics, but answers a question of King Alfred’s court (see D. Whitelock above) about distances, "how long is the North Way?", or "how long is it from your home to the south?". Korhammer claims that Ohthere here uses the worst-case scenario of a theoretical sailing voyage lasting longer than one month for a description of the very great length of the Norwegian coast-line to his Anglo-Saxon audience. This interpretation is strengthened by the immediately following sentence "and all the time he will sail be lande", and later when the mariner comes to Sciringes heal, by "and all the way on the port side North Way".
While sailing along the Norwegian coast, the mariner will first have "Iraland" to starboard, then the islands between "Iraland" and Britain, and finally Britain itself until he comes to Sciringes heal. The principal interpretations of "Iraland" in the Old English Orosius are that it might mean either Ireland or Iceland. While it is possible that the original text of Ohthere's account read "Isaland", for "Iceland", and that the "s" was at some point replaced by "r", geographically the circumstances described are better suited for Iceland than for Ireland. Alternatively, given that "Iraland" occurs in the same form, with an "r", twice on the same manuscript page, and given that Ohthere was a seafarer, it may be that he was describing sea-routes to Ireland and Britain rather than actual directions, with no thought for Iceland. Britain, or England, is regarded as self-evident, represented in Ohthere's account through the phrase "this land" (þis land): Ohthere is reported as giving his account in person to King Alfred of Wessex.

Sciringes heal has been held to represent Skiringssal (Old Norse: Skíringssalr) in almost all relevant historical writing since the early 19th century, mainly by reason of the superficial similarity of the names, to the extent that some modern translations of Ohthere's account feature the name "Skiringssal" in place of "Sciringes heal". An alternative view is that an identification of Sciringes heal with Skiringssal is impossible to reconcile with the detail of Ohthere's account, and is unlikely for historical and linguistic reasons. According to this interpretation, a location for Sciringes heal west of Lindesnes, the southernmost extremity of Norway, is to be preferred, perhaps at Lunde on the Lista peninsula. Whether Sciringes heal was identical with  Skiringssal, or was located in Tjølling parish or west of Lindesnes, it is described in Ohthere's account in the Old English Orosius as a "port" (an port). Ohthere's account uses the same word for the Danish trading settlement of Hedeby (þæm porte), suggesting that Sciringes heal may have been similar in nature, though the Old English word "port" can signify nothing more than a haven.

When Ohthere sailed on from Sciringes heal, he reported having first had Denmark to port and a wide sea to starboard for three days, after which for two days he had islands belonging to Denmark on his port side and Jutland (Gotland and Sillende) and many islands to starboard, before arriving at Hedeby, which lay at the head of the Schlei inlet in what was then south-eastern Denmark. It is in Ohthere's description of this part of the journey that the earliest copy of the Old English Orosius gives the first known mention of the term "Denmark", in the form "dena mearc". However, his first reference to Denmark being on his port side presumably makes reference to areas of the 9th-century Danish kingdom that lay on the Scandinavian peninsula.

The reason for Ohthere's visit to King Alfred of Wessex is not recorded. There is also no mention in the Old English Orosius of how recent the journeys were when Ohthere described them to the king, where the meeting took place, or the route by which Ohthere arrived in southern England.

In modern culture
Ohthere's audience with King Alfred is dramatised in Henry Wadsworth Longfellow's poem "The Discoverer of the North Cape: A Leaf from King Alfred's Orosius", and Ohthere and his journey appear in the 1957 novel The Lost Dragon of Wessex by Gwendolyn Bowers.

Ohthere is portrayed by Ray Stevenson in the historical drama Vikings.

References

Footnotes

Notes

Bibliography

Dictionary of Old English: A to I online (2018), ed. A. Cameron, A. Crandell Amos, A. diPaolo Healey et al., Toronto, doe.utoronto.ca

Bately, J. ed. (1980), The Old English Orosius, Early English Text Society, Supplementary Series 6, Oxford University Press, 
Bately, J.; Englert, A., eds. (2007), Ohthere’s Voyages: a Late 9th-Century Account of Voyages along the Coasts of Norway and Denmark and its Cultural Context, Maritime Culture of the North 1, Roskilde, 
 (link is to contents page with further link to downloadable PDF)
Bosworth-Toller (1898), An Anglo-Saxon Dictionary based on the Manuscript Collections of the late Joseph Bosworth, ed. T. N. Toller, Oxford University Press
Bosworth-Toller (1921), An Anglo-Saxon Dictionary based on the Manuscript Collections of Joseph Bosworth: Supplement by T.N. Toller, Oxford University Press
Bosworth-Toller (1972), An Anglo-Saxon Dictionary based on the Manuscript Collections of Joseph Bosworth: Enlarged Addenda and Corrigenda to the Supplement by A. Campbell, Oxford University Press

 

Pope, J.C., ed. (1967–68), Homilies of Aelfric: a Supplementary Collection, 2 vols., Early English Text Society 259–60, Oxford University Press
, Internet Archive (instantly readable, includes parallel edition of Old English Orosius and Modern English translation)
 (In the appendix: Ohthere's Voyage, pp. 187-190)

External links
 Ohthere's First Voyage. University of Victoria. Retrieved on May 18, 2008. Excerpt only of original text; English translation.
 Old English Online: Lesson 4. University of Texas. Retrieved on May 18, 2008. Excerpt only of original text; detailed grammatical analysis, English translation.

9th-century Norwegian people
Explorers of Europe
Explorers of the Arctic
Norwegian explorers
Viking explorers
White Sea
9th-century businesspeople
9th-century explorers
9th-century Vikings